Kangsti is a village located in Rõuge Parish, Võru County, Estonia.

Gallery

References

Villages in Võru County